Moses Tochukwu Odo, born on December 11, 1997, is a Nigeria football player known for his prowess as a forward.

He currently plays for the Sudanese club AL-Merrikh SC.

Career 
Odo's career in football began during his teenage years from when he played for different football clubs including Kaduna United F.C.; Enugu Rangers and Abia Warriors in the Nigerian Professional Football League.

In 2016, Moses Odo ventured outside of Nigeria when he was transferred to Binatli Yilmaz SK in the KTFF Super lig before being temporarily loaned out to Yenicami Agdelen. The following year, he went back to Nigeria and signed with Nigerian League team, Real Sapphire where he played before joining Haras ElHodoud in Egypt.

At Haras ElHodoud,he scored 10 goals in 32 appearances, then transferred to Misr Lel Makkasa SC and subsequently to Ghazl El Mahalla SC..

At El Mahalla, Moses Odo's contract was terminated after playing in four games without scoring a goal. The club cited disciplinary issues and financial infractions as the reason for ending the player's contract which was originally scheduled to last for two years,

Al Mokawloon Al Arab SC (Arab Contractors) then signed the winger on a free transfer with the intention of filling the void left by Seifeddine Jaziri, who had then joined Zamalek. In August 2022, he signed officially for Al-Merrikh SC, of Sudan who currently competes in the 2022/2023 CAF Champions league..

Clubs 

.

References 

Nigerian footballers
Igbo sportspeople